Al Michaels (born 1944) is an American television sportscaster

Al Michaels may also refer to:
Al Michaels (running back) (1900–1972), American football running back
Al Michaels (American football coach) (1911–1991), head coach of the North Carolina State football team in 1971